SISO may refer to:

Technology
 Single-input single-output system, in control engineering
 Soft-in soft-out decoder, a type of soft-decision decoder

Organisations
 Simulation Interoperability Standards Organization, in modeling and simulation
 Samsung India Software Operations, the former name of Samsung R&D Institute India - Bangalore